Peter Goodwill Spooner (30 August 1910 in Hepscott, England – 1987) was an English footballer.

Career
Spooner played for Newbiggin United before joining Ashington in 1928. He had trials with Newcastle United in 1929. He joined Bradford Park Avenue in 1930, making five appearances and scoring one goal in the league, before joining York City in the summer of 1931. He impressed at the club and joined Sheffield United for a fee of £500 in May 1993 after making 57 appearances and scoring 13 goals in the league. After making 17 appearances and scoring two goals in the league for the club, he returned to York in 1935. In the FA Cup in the 1937–38 season, he scored against Coventry City in the third round and the winner against Middlesbrough in the fifth round. He left the club in May 1939, after making 132 appearances and scoring 29 goals in the league, and joined Gateshead, for whom he made three appearances and scored two goals in the league.

References

1910 births
1987 deaths
Footballers from Northumberland
English footballers
Association football forwards
Ashington A.F.C. players
Newcastle United F.C. players
Bradford (Park Avenue) A.F.C. players
York City F.C. players
Sheffield United F.C. players
Gateshead F.C. players
English Football League players